Růžena Suchá (19 October 1907 – 7 October 1989), also known as Růžena Suchá–Dobiášová, was a Czech chess player. She received the FIDE title of Woman International Master (WIM) in 1954 and was a three-time winner of the Czechoslovak Women's Chess Championship (1938, 1951, 1954).

Biography
From the end of the 1930s to the early 1960s, Sucha was one of the leading Czechoslovakian women's chess players. 
In 1943, she are the only woman who participated in Prague international chess tournament. Tournament won by Alexander Alekhine, second was Paul Keres, but Sucha finished last with 3 draws out of 19 games. She won thirteen medals in the Czechoslovak women's chess championships: three golds (1938, 1951, 1954), three silver (1949, 1952, 1953) and seven bronze (1940, 1943, 1944, 1955, 1956, 1960, 1961).

In 1954, she shared 1st-2nd place in Women's World Chess Championship Zonal Tournament in Leipzig. In 1954, Ruzena Sucha was awarded the FIDE Woman International Master (WIM) title. In 1955, she participated at Women's World Chess Championship Candidates Tournament in Moscow when ranked 19th place.

Also known as chess life organizer. In 1974, she was one of the founders of the chess club in Smíchov. After her death, her memorial tournaments are regularly held at this club.

References

External links
 
 
 

1907 births
1989 deaths
Czechoslovak female chess players
Czech female chess players
Chess Woman International Masters
20th-century chess players